Radio First (Liggett Communications, L.L.C.) is a privately held radio broadcasting company in Michigan owned by Victoria L. Liggett and James A. Jensen. Liggett Communications is  headquartered in Port Huron where it owns five radio stations licensed to St. Clair and Sanilac Counties. These five stations operate under the brand name of Radio First where they serve listeners in the Thumb area of Michigan and Southwestern Ontario.

History

Liggett Broadcasting (1970-2000)
The predecessor to the current company was called Liggett Broadcasting and was founded by Robert Liggett Jr. in 1971. His first station was WFMK in the Lansing, Michigan market. He then added more stations in Lansing, as well as the Grand Rapids, Flint, and Saginaw/Bay City Markets. Liggett Broadcasting at its peak operated radio stations in Michigan, New York, Minnesota, South Carolina, Ohio, and California. Liggett's stations were sold to Citadel Broadcasting in 2000, with Liggett becoming a member of Citadel's board of directors.

In 2000, Ligget became the owner of Big Boy Restaurants, headquartered in Warren, Michigan.

Liggett Communications (1999-present)
In 1999, Bob Liggett announced he would purchase WHLS 1450 and WSAQ 107.1 in Port Huron from the estate of former owner John Wismer. The new company would be called Liggett Communications. Wismer had owned the stations from 1952 until he died in 1999. WSAQ and WHLS were purchased by Liggett for $3.2 million. The new Liggett Communications also entered into an agreement to purchase Hanson Communications, Wismer's crosstown competitor and licensee of WPHM, WBTI, and WHYT (now WHLX). Owner Lee Hanson sold those stations to Liggett for $2.24 million. Lee Hanson died in 2015, his son Eric, owns and operates Hanson Pro Music located next to the former WPHM studios on Military Street. However, Liggett was unsuccessful in buying standalone commercial station WGRT, which remains the only commercial station licensed to St. Clair County not owned by Liggett.

By the end of 2000, Liggett received all necessary FCC approvals to buy both Hanson Communications and Wismer Broadcasting. All five stations became a part of Liggett's new company. For about a year the Hanson stations continued to use their old studio at 2379 Military Street, which is now is home to a Coldwel Banker office and Hanson's Pro Music. Wismer's facilities at 808 Huron Avenue were expanded and now house the studios and offices for all five stations. 1380 WPHM, 96.9 WBTI, 107.1 WSAQ, 1590 WHLX, and 1450 WHLS now operate under the collective brand name of Radio First.

On May 15, 2019 control of Liggett Communication's five radio stations and two translators were transferred from Robert G. Liggett,  Jr. to Victoria L. Liggett.  Robert Liggett passed away on July 12, 2019.

Community involvement
Radio First sponsors an annual local bridal and home expo show held at Blue Water Convention Center. The stations also support many local events, including the March of Dimes "Jail and Bail", the Child Abuse and Neglect Council's "Roof Sit", and Port Huron Police Department's CAPTURE witness tip-line.

Current radio stations

 WBTI, FM 96.9, Lexington, Michigan, adult top 40
 WHLS, AM 1450, Port Huron, Michigan, active rock
 W288BT FM 105.5, St. Clair, Michigan, active rock (FM translator of WHLS)
 WHLX, AM 1590, Marine City, Michigan, country/rock/folk
 W224DT FM 92.7, Port Huron, Michigan, country/rock/folk (FM translator of WHLX)
 WPHM AM 1380, Port Huron, Michigan, news/talk/sports
 WSAQ, FM 107.1, Port Huron, Michigan, mainstream country pop

Former radio stations

Lansing/East Lansing
WFMK FM 99.1, Lansing, Michigan
WITL FM 100.7, Lansing, Michigan
WJIM-FM 97.5, Lansing, Michigan
WJIM AM 1240, Lansing, Michigan
WMMQ FM 94.9, East Lansing, Michigan
WVFN AM 730, East Lansing, Michigan

Saginaw/Bay City/Midland
WHNN FM 96.1, Bay City, Michigan
WBCM AM 1440, Bay City, Michigan (now WMAX (AM))
WTCF FM 100.5, Carrollton, Michigan (now WSGW-FM)

Flint
WFBE FM 95.1, Flint, Michigan
WTRX AM 1330, Flint, Michigan

Detroit
WCLS (now WYCD)

Minneapolis/St. Paul
WLOL-FM (now KSJN)

Adrian
WABJ AM 1490, Adrian, Michigan
WQT] FM 95.3. Adrian, Michigan

Battle Creek
 WBCK AM 930, Battle Creek, Michigan (now WFAT)
 WBCK FM 95.3, Battle Creek, Michigan
 WELL AM 1400, Battle Creek, Michigan (now WBFN)

Grand Rapids
WLHT FM 95.7, Grand Rapids, Michigan
WGRD-FM FM 97.9, Grand Rapids, Michigan

External links
WHLS/WHLX
WPHM
WBTI
WSAQ

References

St. Clair County, Michigan
Radio broadcasting companies of the United States
Mass media in Michigan
Companies based in Michigan